Senad Tiganj (born 28 August 1975) is a retired Slovenian footballer who played as a forward.

International career
Tiganj made his debut and scored his only goal for Slovenia national football team on 6 October 2001 against Faroe Islands. He played four games for the Slovenian national team and was a part of the Slovenian 2002 FIFA World Cup squad.

International goals
Scores and results list Slovenia's goal tally first, score column indicates score after each Tiganj goal.

References

External links
NZS profile 

1975 births
Living people
Sportspeople from Jesenice, Jesenice
Slovenian footballers
Association football forwards
Slovenia international footballers
Slovenian expatriate footballers
2002 FIFA World Cup players
NK Svoboda Ljubljana players
Lommel S.K. players
NK Mura players
Hapoel Kfar Saba F.C. players
NK Olimpija Ljubljana (1945–2005) players
FC Karpaty Lviv players
HNK Rijeka players
NK Ljubljana players
FC Rot-Weiß Erfurt players
SV Wacker Burghausen players
SSV Jahn Regensburg players
NK Drava Ptuj players
Kapfenberger SV players
NK Aluminij players
NK Olimpija Ljubljana (2005) players
NK IB 1975 Ljubljana players
Slovenian PrvaLiga players
Belgian Pro League players
Ukrainian Premier League players
Croatian Football League players
2. Bundesliga players
Regionalliga players
Slovenian Second League players
Expatriate footballers in Austria
Expatriate footballers in Belgium
Expatriate footballers in Israel
Expatriate footballers in Ukraine
Expatriate footballers in Croatia
Expatriate footballers in Germany
Slovenian expatriate sportspeople in Austria
Slovenian expatriate sportspeople in Belgium
Slovenian expatriate sportspeople in Israel
Slovenian expatriate sportspeople in Ukraine
Slovenian expatriate sportspeople in Croatia
Slovenian expatriate sportspeople in Germany